is a chain of used goods stores in Japan. It specializes in otaku- and hobbyist-related items, including anime goods, manga, dōjinshi (self-published works), and voice actor and idol goods.

History
It opened a second location in Sugamo in 1994, and was incorporated and rebranded as K-Books that same year. Locations were opened in the Tokyo neighborhoods of Kichijoji, Ikebukuro, and Akihabara in the mid- to late 1990s. Its first locations outside of Tokyo were opened in Osaka in 2002, and Nagoya in 2017.

In February 2019, K-Books ceased consignment sales for dōjinshi at its dōjin store in Ikebukuro after 15 years.

Products
K-Books sells variety of secondhand otaku and Japanese pop culture goods, including  dōjinshi (self-published works), manga, novels, dolls, cosplay items, anime and video game goods, as well as voice actor and idol goods. Several K-Books locations specialize in specific kinds of goods or genres, including yaoi, Vocaloid, and 2.5D musicals.

In addition to its retail business, K-Books operates several cosplay restaurants and bars: Ikemofu, a costumed animal café; Swallowtail, a butler café; and Bar Blue Moon, a nighttime bar operated by the butlers of Swallowtail. It also operates Atis Collection, a yaoi audio drama production label.

Major locations
K-Books Akihabara Hon-kan is located at Akihabara in the Akihabara Radio Kaikan building. It specializes in items aimed at men, such as moe and Virtual YouTuber goods. K-Books Chara-kan is located in Chiyoda and specializes in goods from Weekly Shōnen Jump media properties, such as My Hero Academia and Demon Slayer. K-Books Ikebukuro Doujin-kan is located in Ikebukuro on Otome Road, and specializes in boys' love-related items.

See also 
 Animate
 Book Off
 Comic Toranoana
 Comic Takaoka
 Mandarake

References

External links

 K-Books official website 

Japanese companies established in 1992
Retail companies based in Tokyo
Retail companies established in 1992